Dovhe is the Ukrainian name of several places.

 Dovhe, Slovianoserbsk Raion, in eastern Ukraine
 Dovhe, Stryi Raion, in western Ukraine
 Dovhe, Zakarpattia Oblast (historical Northern Maramureș) in western Ukraine
 Długie, Sanok County, in south eastern Poland, called Dovhe in Ukrainian
 Mostyshche, a village in western Ukraine formerly called Dovhe

See also 
 Dolge (disambiguation), the Russian form of this name